Tony D'Amario (10 July 1960 - 29 June 2005 in Paris) was a French actor best known for his role as K2 in Banlieue 13.

He made his film debut in 1999, with a small role in The Messenger: The Story of Joan of Arc. He followed this with a string of small film roles throughout the early 2000s, and appeared in an episode of the long-running crime series Central nuit in 2003. His most notable film role came in the 2004 film Banlieue 13, in which he portrayed one of the main antagonists. After this he appeared in an episode of Le Tuteur. D'Amario died of an aneurysm that led to a heart attack on June 29, 2005, while filming Last Hour.

Filmography

References

1961 births
2005 deaths
French male film actors
French people of Italian descent